{{Infobox comics creator
| name          = Marshall Rogers
| image         = Marshall Rogers 1979.jpg
| imagesize     = 
| caption       = Marshall Rogers, New York City, 1979
| birth_name    = William Marshall Rogers III
| birth_date    = 
| birth_place   = Flushing, New York, U.S.
| death_date    = 
| death_place   = Fremont, California, U.S.
| nationality   = American
| cartoonist    = 
| write         = 
| art           = 
| pencil        = y
| ink           = y
| edit          = 
| publish       = 
| letter        = 
| color         = y
| alias         = 
| notable works = Detective ComicsDetectives Inc.
| awards        = Extended list
| website       = 
}}
William Marshall Rogers III (January 22, 1950 – March 24, 2007), known professionally as Marshall Rogers, was an American comics artist best known for his work at Marvel and DC Comics in the 1970s.

Biography

Rogers was born in the Flushing neighborhood of the New York City borough of Queens, and raised there and in Ardsley, New York. He took up mechanical drawing in high school, and then attended Kent State University in Ohio, where he studied architecture. He said later that he felt this

He studied architectural drawing, and his work was characterized by  detailed rendering of buildings and structures.

He left college in 1971 before graduating, and returned home to New York, where he discovered his family was moving to Denver, Colorado, where his father's employer, Johns Manville, was relocating. Opting to remain, he completed a 52-page story he had begun in college and presented it in 1972 as a sample to Marvel Comics production manager John Verpoorten, who found Rogers' work wanting. To earn a living, Rogers did illustrations for men's magazines that he described as "[r]eal low-grade schlock sleazo magazines that had illustrations to precede the stories". When one client went bankrupt owing him at least $1,000, a friend, Jim Geraghty, offered him a rent-free house for the winter in Easthampton, New York, on Long Island, in exchange for "four or five illustrations" for a local art project. The following summer he worked in a hardware store for several months, was fired, and while living on unemployment benefits approached the short-lived Atlas/Seaboard Comics and, he said:

At some unspecified point, Rogers recalled, he "bounced in and out of a shipping clerk job" and did some retouching work for DC Comics on reprints of 1940s Batman stories. He continued showing samples to both Marvel and DC, and in 1977, his artwork began interesting Marie Severin and Vince Colletta, the two companies' respective art directors. "That got me my first job; it wasn't really the drawing ability", he said in 1980, "as much as my design capabilities."

Some of his first comic-book work appeared in the black-and-white magazine The Deadly Hands of Kung Fu, where he worked with writer Chris Claremont on a story featuring the "Iron Fist" supporting characters Misty Knight and Colleen Wing as the Daughters of the Dragon. He eschewed the grey wash that was used in other black-and-white comics stories in favor of applying screentone.

With writer Steve Englehart, Rogers penciled an acclaimed run on the Batman in Detective Comics #471–476 (Aug. 1977 - April 1978), providing one of the definitive interpretations that influenced the 1989 movie Batman and that was adapted for the 1990s animated series. The Englehart and Rogers pairing was described in 2009 by comics writer and historian Robert Greenberger as "one of the greatest" creative teams to work on the Batman character. DC Comics writer and executive Paul Levitz noted in 2010: "Arguably fans' best-loved version of Batman in the mid-1970s, writer Steve Englehart and penciller Rogers's Detective run featured an unambiguously homicidal Joker...in noirish, moodily rendered stories that evoked the classic Kane-Robinson era." In their story "The Laughing Fish", the Joker is brazen enough to disfigure fish with a rictus grin, then expects to be granted a federal trademark on them, only to start killing bureaucrats who try to explain that obtaining such a claim on a natural resource is legally impossible. The supervillain Deadshot was redesigned by Rogers during his Detective Comics run. Rogers also penciled the origin story of the Golden Age Batman in Secret Origins #6 (Sept. 1986) with writer Roy Thomas and inker Terry Austin.

The two also did a sequel miniseries, Batman: Dark Detective, and worked together on other series, including Marvel's The Silver Surfer and a short run on DC's revived Mister Miracle. Englehart and Rogers' first Batman run was collected in the trade paperback Batman: Strange Apparitions, and the second run in Batman: Dark Detective. Rogers remained as artist on Detective Comics for a few issues after Englehart's departure from the series. With writer Len Wein, he co-created the third version of the supervillain Clayface. Rogers' other Batman work included a story arc in Batman: Legends of the Dark Knight that was begun by writer Archie Goodwin and completed by James Robinson.

An Englehart-Rogers story featuring Madame Xanadu that sat in inventory for a few years was published as a one-shot in 1981, in DC's first attempt at marketing comics specifically to the "direct market" of fans and collectors. In 1986, Rogers drew a graphic novel adaptation of "Demon with a Glass Hand", an episode of The Outer Limits television series, based on a script by Harlan Ellison. It was the fifth title of the DC Science Fiction Graphic Novel series.

At Eclipse Comics during the early 1980s, he collaborated on the graphic novel Detectives Inc. with writer Don McGregor, drew the Scorpio Rose series and the first Coyote series written by Englehart, and wrote and drew his own whimsical series Cap'N Quick & A Foozle. In 1992, McGregor and Rogers crafted a two part-story for Marvel in Spider-Man issues #27–28 dealing with bullying and gun violence.

Personal life
Rogers' mother was Ann White Rogers. He had a sister, Suzanne, and an adopted son, Russell Young.

Rogers died on March 24, 2007, at his home in Fremont, California. His Batman collaborator Steve Englehart said he was told by Spencer Beck, Rogers' agent: "His son found him. They think it was a heart attack, and that he might have been dead for a while."

Awards
 1978: nominated at the Eagle Awards for Favourite Artist, for Favourite Single Story for Detective Comics #472: "I am the Batman" with Steve Englehart and for Favourite Continued Story for Detective Comics #471-472 with Steve Englehart
 1979: Inkpot Award
 1979: nominated at the Eagle Awards for Favourite Comicbook Artist (US), for Best Continued Story for Detective Comics #475-476 with Steve Englehart, and for Best Cover for Detective Comics #476

Bibliography
Comics work (interior pencil art, except where noted) includes:

DC ComicsAction Comics #566 (cover only, with Jerry Ordway) (1985)All-Star Squadron #38 (three pages only) (1984)Atari Force #18, Special #1 (1985–1986)Batman Family #11–13 (pages 9–16 only in #13) (1977)Batman: Dark Detective, miniseries, #1–6 (2005)Batman: Legends of the Dark Knight #132–136 (2000)DC Graphic Novel Demon With a Glass Hand, graphic novel (1986), 144 pages, DC Special Series #15 (1978) (Batman)Detective Comics #466–468, 471–479, 481 (1976–1979)Green Lantern #187 (1985)Green Lantern: Evil's Might, miniseries, #1–3 (2002)Heroes Against Hunger (two pages only) (1986)House of Mystery #254, 274 (1977–1979)Justice League America Annual #5 (1991)Justice League Europe #20–22, Annual #2 (1990–1991)Madame Xanadu #1 (1981) (originally produced for Doorway to Nightmare)Mister Miracle #19–22 (1977–1978)Mister Miracle vol. 3 #5–6 (1996)Mystery in Space #111 (1980)Realworlds: Batman (2000)Secret Origins (Golden Age Batman) #6 (1986)The Shadow vol. 3 #7 (1988)Superman #400 (1984)The Superman Family #182, 194 (1977–1979)The Unexpected #191 (1979)Weird War Tales #51–52 (1977)Who's Who: The Definitive Directory of the DC Universe #1–2, 5–7, 11–12, 15, 24 (1985–1987)World's Finest Comics #259 (1979)

Eclipse ComicsCap'n Quick & A Foozle #1–2 (1984–1985), writer/artistDetectives Inc.: A Remembrance of Threatening Green, graphic novel (1980), 52 pagesEclipse Magazine #1 ("Slab"), #2–8 (Coyote feature) (1981–1983)Eclipse Monthly #1–4 (Cap'n Quick feature) (1983–1984), writer/artistScorpio Rose #1–2 (1983)

Marvel ComicsAmazing Fantasy #19 (2006)Avengers Annual #16 (among other artists) (1987)Bizarre Adventures #25 (1981)Deadly Hands of Kung Fu #32–33 (1977)Doctor Strange #48–53 (1981–1982)Excalibur #10–11 (1989)Fantastic Four Roast #1 (among other artists) (1982)G.I. Joe #61, 75, 77, 82, 86 (1987–1989)Howard the Duck (black and white magazine) #8 (1980)The Incredible Hulk vol. 3 #94–95 (2006)Marvel Comics Presents (Hulk) #38, (Daredevil) #81 (1989–1991)Marvel Westerns: Strange Westerns Starring the Black Rider #1 (2006)Marvel Fanfare (Doctor Strange) #5 (1982)Silver Surfer vol. 3 #1–10, 12, 21 (1987–1989)Spider-Man #27–28 (1992)What If vol. 2 #38 (Thor) (1992)

Books and compilationsBatman: Dark Detective collects Batman: Dark Detective #1–6, April 2006, DC Comics, 144 pages,  Batman: Strange Apparitions includes Detective Comics #471–476 and #478–479, December 1999, DC Comics, 176 pages, Coyote Volume 1 collects Eclipse Magazine #2–8 and Scorpio Rose #1–2, September 2005, Image Comics, 128 pages, Legends of the Dark Knight - Marshall Rogers collects Detective Comics #468, #471–479 and #481, DC Special Series #15, Secret Origins #6, Batman: Legends of the Dark Knight #132–136 and Batman: Dark Detective #1–6, November 2011, DC Comics, 496 pages, Shadow Of The Batman miniseries #1–5 (covers) (1985–1986), DC ComicsDaughters Of The Dragon Special #1 (2005), Marvel ComicsSilver Surfer Epic Collection #3: Freedom collects Silver Surfer #1–10 and #12, Marvel Comics

PortfoliosStrange (1979), Schanes & Schanes, six plates, 1200 signed and numberedThe Batman - Portfolio #1 (1981), S.Q. Productions Inc, five plates, s/n 1000F.O.O.G. (Friends Of Old Gerber) (1982), one plate (Cap'N Quick & A Foozle)Heroines (1979), one plate (Pulp Heroine)Heroes, Heavies & Heroines (1981), one plate (Nightcrawler)

Comic strips
In 1989, he was the first artist to work on the new Batman newspaper comic strip. Rogers drew the strip from its launch on November 6, 1989 until the conclusion of its first storyline on January 21, 1990. The entirety of Rogers work on the strip was reprinted in Comics Revue'' #41–43.

References

External links
 
 "DC Profiles #26: Marshall Rogers" at the Grand Comics Database
 Marshall Rogers at the Lambiek Comiclopedia
 
 Marshall Rogers at Mike's Amazing World of Comics
 Marshall Rogers at the Unofficial Handbook of Marvel Comics Creators
 Marshall Rogers Fan Site, Cavalli, David, ed.

1950 births
2007 deaths
American comics artists
Inkpot Award winners
Marvel Comics people
People from Ardsley, New York
People from Flushing, Queens
People from Fremont, California
Role-playing game artists